Heliopsis annua is a species of flowering plant in the family Asteraceae. It is widespread across much of northern and central Mexico from Chihuahua and Coahuila as far south as Puebla and Michoacán.

References

External links

Photo of herbarium specimen collected in Nuevo León in 1989

annua
Flora of Mexico
Plants described in 1881